William Adams Walker (June 5, 1805 – December 18, 1861) was a U.S. Representative from New York.

Born in Portsmouth, New Hampshire, Walker attended the common schools and Northampton Law School. He was admitted to the bar but never engaged in the practice of law.

He moved to New York City in 1832. He was appointed principal of a public school in New York City, and became county superintendent of common schools from 1843 to 1847. He served as member of the board of aldermen in 1846, but was defeated for reelection in 1847. He served as commissioner of jurors until elected to Congress.

Walker was elected as a Democrat to the Thirty-third Congress (March 4, 1853 – March 3, 1855).

He declined to be a candidate for renomination in 1854. In 1857, he ran but lost for board of aldermen.

He died in Irvington, New York, December 18, 1861. He was interred in Sleepy Hollow Cemetery, Tarrytown, New York.

Sources

External links

1805 births
1861 deaths
Northampton Law School alumni
Burials at Sleepy Hollow Cemetery
Politicians from Portsmouth, New Hampshire
Politicians from New York City
Democratic Party members of the United States House of Representatives from New York (state)
19th-century American politicians